The Episcopal Diocese of Idaho is the diocese of the Episcopal Church in the United States of America, with jurisdiction over Idaho south of the Salmon River, and one congregation in western Wyoming. Located in Province 8, its cathedral is St. Michael's in Boise, as are the diocesan offices.

Congregations in northern Idaho are part of the Episcopal Diocese of Spokane.

List of bishops
The bishops of Idaho have been:
 Daniel S. Tuttle, (1867–1887)
 Ethelbert Talbot, (1887–1898),
 James Bowen Funsten, (1899–1918)
 Herman Page, (1919 - 1919)
 Frank H. Touret, (1919–1924)
 Herbert H. H. Fox, (1925–1926)
 Middleton S. Barnwell, (1926–1935)
 Frederick B. Bartlett, (1935–1941)
 Frank A. Rhea, (1942–1957)
 Norman L. Foote, (1957–1972)
 Hanford L. King, Jr. (1972–1981)
 David B. Birney, IV, (1982–1989)
 John S. Thornton (1990–1998)
 Harry Brown Bainbridge, III (1998–2008)
 Brian J. Thom (2008–2022)
 Jos Tharakan (2022-Present)

See also

 List of Succession of Bishops for the Episcopal Church, USA
 Roman Catholic Diocese of Boise

References

External links
Episcopal Diocese of Idaho website
 Episcopal Diocese of Idaho history
St. Michael's Cathedral, Boise
Official Web site of the Episcopal Church

Idaho
Episcopal Church in Idaho
Protestantism in Idaho
Religious organizations established in 1867
Anglican dioceses established in the 19th century
1867 establishments in Idaho Territory
Province 8 of the Episcopal Church (United States)